The Electrical Life of Louis Wain is a 2021 biographical comedy-drama film directed by Will Sharpe, from a story by Simon Stephenson, and screenplay by Stephenson and Sharpe. The film stars Benedict Cumberbatch (as the eccentric artist Louis Wain), Claire Foy, Andrea Riseborough and Toby Jones.

The Electrical Life of Louis Wain had its world premiere at the 48th Telluride Film Festival on 2 September 2021,  had a limited release on 22 October 2021, and was released in the United States on Prime Video on 5 November 2021. It was released in the United Kingdom on 1 January 2022, by StudioCanal.

Plot
In 1881, 18 months after his father's death, Louis Wain, the only male and eldest of the Wain family, becomes the primary breadwinner. He supports five sisters and his mother working part-time as an illustrator for The Illustrated London News under editor Sir William Ingram. Ingram offers him a full-time job, but Wain declines in order to try his hand at composing music and playwriting; which he hopes will support the family but neither venture is successful.

Louis hires Emily Richardson to be the new governess for his sisters. The two become instantly attracted to each other, much to the dismay of the eldest sister, Caroline. Louis decides to take the full time position in order to keep Emily as the governess. One night, Louis takes the family, and Emily to the theatre to see The Tempest as an educational trip. She comforts Louis in the men's restroom after he has a recurring nightmare about drowning during the performance, but inadvertently causes a scandal when nosy neighbor Mrs. DuFrane tells people about the incident. Embarrassed, Caroline fires her that night. Before she can leave, Louis professes his love for her and they begin a courtship.

In 1884, the couple marry, which causes another scandal for the Wain family due to her being 10 years older than him; and her social status as a governess which is considered lower class. They move into a house in Hampstead, where Louis takes additional work as a freelance artist to continue supporting his mother and sisters. Months later, Emily is diagnosed with breast cancer. While walking in the countryside, they take in a stray kitten they name Peter, to relieve the grief of Emily's cancer. The practice of keeping a cat as a pet was unusual in the Victorian era. Louis begins painting realistic pictures of Peter, but the paintings become more unusual as Emily's condition worsens. He makes the cats more anthropomorphic, with them engaging in human behaviour.

A financial crisis in England causes the paper to cut staff. Sir William tells Louis that he will have cut his workload, and advises him to use the extra time to spend with Emily. After showing Emily his work, she encourages him to show them to Sir William who uses the drawings in two pages of the Christmas edition. Although the edition becomes a success, Emily dies months later. Louis begins drawing more cat pictures to cope with losing the love of his life, creating whole cat societies, but it also begins to show Wain's detachment from reality.

By 1891, Wain's cat pictures become enormously popular. They are featured on postcards, greeting cards, and other print materials. Wain also sends some of his drawings abroad. The drawings change peoples' perception of cats, making them acceptable as house pets. He hosts cat-themed events and is made chairman of The National Cat Society. Despite the popularity of his work, the family remains in debt. Wain fails to copyright his work, so he cannot profit from any reproductions of the art. To make matters worse, Marie, the youngest, begins to show signs of mental illness. The debt causes the family to be evicted from the Hampstead home.

Sir William allows the family to stay at one of his properties at a reduced rate. Marie is admitted to an asylum, and Peter dies, causing Wain's own mental health to deteriorate. In 1907, Wain travels to New York, on a trip sponsored by newspaper magnate William Randolph Hearst. Wain hopes to forge a successful career in America to alleviate his debts.  He meets Max Kase, who tells him that people love the pictures. Days after arriving, he receives news that his mother has died of influenza. He has some success in NYC, but returns to England in 1914 at Caroline's request.

Upon arriving home, Louis is given the news that Marie, too, has died from influenza. Sir William also dies, succumbing to his gout. The family is evicted, and moves into a smaller flat in London. Louis continues to work as Britain enters World War I. He hits his head trying to jump off a double decker bus, and falls into coma; where he sees a vision of 1999. Coming out of the coma, he is inspired to design futuristic themed cat toys. The toys are manufactured, which looks to change the Wains' fortunes, but their hopes are dashed when a German U-Boat sinks the ship carrying the toys.

In 1917, Caroline dies. The losses of Emily, his mother, Marie, Peter, Sir William and Caroline causes Louis to go on a series of violent mental breakdowns. In 1924, his sisters are forced to have him committed to the Springfield Mental Hospital in Tooting. Dan Rider, an official inspecting the mental institution recognizes Louis; in 1881 Louis drew his dog Cleopatra for free while they rode a train. After speaking with Louis, he starts a campaign, along with Wain's three remaining sisters (who never married) to raise money that will place Louis in a better facility that allows cats and provides patients access to outdoors.

The campaign gets an enormous response, as thousands of admirers of Wain's art contribute. The author H.G. Wells, also a fan of Louis's work, along with other prominent British figures, assist with the effort. After raising the money needed. Louis is transferred to Bethlem Royal Hospital in Southwark, where he has a cat companion. In 1930, he is admitted Napsbury Hospital in St. Albans.

Guided by Emily's spirit, and with his journal and a cut-out piece of Emily's old scarf, Louis goes out to the painted countryside, where Emily once told him that he would find her there.

Cast

Production
Simon Stephenson's original script was selected for the Britlist of the UK's hottest unproduced scripts in 2014.

The film was announced in July 2019, with Benedict Cumberbatch, Claire Foy, Andrea Riseborough and Toby Jones cast. Will Sharpe would co-write and direct, with filming beginning on August 10 in London. In August 2019, Aimee Lou Wood, Hayley Squires, Stacy Martin, Julian Barratt, Sharon Rooney, Adeel Akhtar and Asim Chaudhry joined the cast of the film.

In September 2019, production visited the Kent coast to film various scenes. The exterior and conservatory of The Coast House B&B in Deal doubled as Bendigo Lodge, the home that Louis and his sisters take by the seaside. Botany Bay and Kingsgate Bay in Broadstairs also feature in the film, as well as Deal and Kingsdown seafront.

Release
The film premiered at the  Telluride Film Festival in Colorado on 2 September 2021, followed by a screening at the 2021 Toronto International Film Festival that same month. It began its limited release on 22 October 2021. It was released on Prime Video on 5 November 2021.

Reception

References

External links
 

2020s English-language films
2021 films
2021 biographical drama films
2021 comedy-drama films
British biographical drama films
British comedy-drama films
British psychological drama films
Biographical films about painters
Films about cancer in the United Kingdom
Films about cats
Films about families
Films about interclass romance
Films about schizophrenia
Films about siblings
Films set in Hertfordshire
Films set in London
British films set in New York City
Films set in 1881
Films set in 1884
Films set in 1891
Films set in 1990
Films set in 1907
Films set in 1914
Films set in 1925
Films set in 1930
Films set in the 1880s
Films set in the 1890s
Films set in the 1990s
Films set in the 1910s
Films shot in London
Amazon Studios films
Film4 Productions films
StudioCanal films
2020s British films